Pinner is a suburb in north-west London.

Pinner may also refer to:

People 
 Adolf Pinner (1842-1909), German Jewish chemist
 Artose Pinner (born 1978), American football player
 David Pinner (born 1940), British actor and novelist
 Pinball Clemons (nicknamed Pinner; born 1965), Canadian Football League player and sports executive
 Shaun Pinner

Places 
 Pinner House, a historic mansion in Pinner
 Pinner tube station, London
 Ruislip, Northwood and Pinner (UK Parliament constituency)

See also 
 Pin (disambiguation)
 Pinner reaction, an organic reaction
 Pinners, a neighborhood game
 Pinning (disambiguation)